Las Agullas Airport,  is one of several airstrips serving communities on the western side of Rapel Lake in the O'Higgins Region of Chile.

See also

Transport in Chile
List of airports in Chile

References

External links
OpenStreetMap - Las Agullas
OurAirports - Las Agullas
FallingRain - Las Agullas Airport

Airports in O'Higgins Region